The women's shot put at the 1974 European Athletics Championships was held in Rome, Italy, at Stadio Olimpico on 2 September 1974.

Medalists

Results

Final
2 September

Participation
According to an unofficial count, 11 athletes from 6 countries participated in the event.

 (3)
 (1)
 (2)
 (1)
 (1)
 (3)

References

Shot put
Shot put at the European Athletics Championships
1974 in women's athletics